Methodist College is a four-year, private college in Peoria, Illinois. It is affiliated with UnityPoint Health and focuses on healthcare related coursework. It is accredited by the Higher Learning Commission since its founding in 2008. The College offers bachelor and master of science degrees, and certificate programs in nursing, social work, healthcare management, and health sciences.

The college traces its origin to the Deaconess Home and Hospital opened in 1900. The college is not affiliated with the United Methodist Church.

References

External links

Universities and colleges in Peoria, Illinois
Educational institutions established in 2008
2008 establishments in Illinois
Private universities and colleges in Illinois
Nursing schools in Illinois